Wei Ru may refer to:
Doris Lai Wei Ru, member of Taiwanese group, 7 Flowers
Wei Ru (entertainer) Taiwanese television host, see Queen's (drama)